Finbar is an Irish given name that may also be spelled Finbarr, Finbarre, or Finnbar. It is derived from Fionnbharr, an old Irish word meaning "fair-headed one". The anglicised, shortened translation of Finbar is Barry.
Finbar may refer to:

People
Saint Finbar (550-620), Irish bishop
Finbarr Clancy (born 1970), Irish musician
Finbar Furey (born 1946), Irish musician
Finbar Lynch (born 1959), Irish actor
Finbar McConnell (born 1967), Irish Gaelic football player
Finbarr O'Reilly, Canadian photographer
Finbar Wright (born 1957), Irish musician

Places
Saint Fin Barre's Cathedral, Cork, Ireland
St. Finbarr's Cemetery, Cork, Ireland
St. Finbar Catholic Church, Burbank, California, United States
Cathedral of Saint John and Saint Finbar, South Carolina, United States

Other uses
Finvarra (alternately named Finbar or Fionnbharr), king of the Aos Sí in Gaelic folklore
Finbar McBride, fictional character in the 2003 film The Station Agent
Finbar McMullen, fictional character in the 1995 film The Brothers McMullen
Finbarr Saunders, British comic strip
Finbar, the shark character in the British stop motion children's show Rubbadubbers
L.A. Noire Character, Finbarr 'Rusty' Galloway

See also
List of Irish-language given names